Jeff Bertram (born January 24, 1960) is an American politician who served in the Minnesota House of Representatives from 1987 to 1997.

References

1960 births
Living people
Democratic Party members of the Minnesota House of Representatives